Coloring Book is the fourth extended play (EP) by South Korean girl group Oh My Girl. It was released by WM Entertainment on 3 April 2017, distributed by LOEN Entertainment. The album contains five songs, including the single "Coloring Book". JinE did not participate in this album as she continued to recover and receive treatment before her departure from the group.

Background
On March 13, WM Entertainment announced on Oh My Girl's fancafe that their next album is scheduled to be released in April. JinE will not be taking part in upcoming album promotions and activities in favor of continued treatment and recovery. WM has also stated that JinE's health has improved since last year, and WM is focusing on long-term treatment for JinE.

A teaser of a mini-album and their scheduled date was released on April 3, 2017 alongside the accompanying music video.

Release
The group started promoting on the single on various music shows.

Track listing

Personnel 
Credits adapted from EP liner notes.

Locations

 Recorded at Vibe Studio ("Real World", "Agit", "Perfect Day")
 Recorded at W Sound ("In My Dreams")
 Edited at W Sound ("Perfect Day")
 Mixed at W Sound ("Coloring Book", "In My Dreams", "Perfect Day")
 Mixed at Koko Sound Studio ("Real World")
 Mixed at Bono Studio ("Agit")
 Mastered at JFS Mastering

Personnel

 Oh My Girl – vocals
 WM Entertainment Inc. – executive producer
 Lee Won-min – producer
 Kim Jin-mi – executive director
 72 – music producer
 Jang Woo-young – recording engineer
 Heo Eun-sook – recording engineer
 Choi Ja-yeon – recording engineer
 Jung Mo-yeon – recording engineer
 Maxx Song – recording engineer
 Jo Joon-seong – mixing engineer
 Go Seung-wook – mixing engineer
 Go Hyun-jung – mixing engineer
 Kwon Nam-woo – mastering engineer
 Soulme – choreography director
 Shin Hui-won – music video director
 Jo Dae-young – art direction and design
 Keema – art direction and design
 Seo Joon-gyo – photographer
 David Anthony – keyboard, guitar, bass guitar, drum programming, horn (on "Coloring Book")
 Kang Hyun-joo – background vocals (on "Coloring Book")
 Maxx Song – vocal director, recording engineer, digital editor (on "Coloring Book")
 Jang Woo-young – recording engineer (on "Real World"), digital editor (on "Coloring Book", "Real World", "Agit", "In My Dreams")
 Heo Eun-sook – mix assistant (on "Coloring Book", "In My Dreams", "Perfect Day"), digital editor (on "Perfect Day")
 Choi Ja-yeon – mix assistant (on "Coloring Book", "In My Dreams", "Perfect Day"), recording engineer (on "In My Dreams")
 Jo Joon-seong – mix engineer (on "Coloring Book", "In My Dreams", "Perfect Day")
 Kwon Nam-woo – mastering engineer (on "Coloring Book", "Real World", "Agit", "In My Dreams", "Perfect Day")
 Sean Alexander – keyboard (on "Real World", "In My Dreams"), guitar, bass guitar, drum programming (on "Real World"), additional programming (on "Agit")
 Park Eun-ooh – background vocals (on "Real World", "In My Dreams")
 72 – vocal director (on "Real World", "Agit", "In My Dreams", "Perfect Day")
 Moon Jeong-gyu – vocal director (on "Real World", "Agit", "In My Dreams", "Perfect Day")
 Jeong Mo-yeon – recording engineer (on "Real World", "Agit", "Perfect Day")
 Go Hyun-jung – mixing engineer (on "Real World")
 Andreas Öberg – keyboard (on "Agit", "In My Dreams"), guitar (on "Agit", "In My Dreams", "Perfect Day")
 Darren Smith – keyboard, drum programming (on "Agit", "In My Dreams"), string arrangement (on "In My Dreams")
 Hyun Seunghee (Oh My Girl) – background vocals (on "Agit", "Perfect Day")
 Seon Young – mix assistant (on "Agit")
 Go Seung-wook – mixing engineer (on "Agit")
 SeventyEight – keyboard, bass guitar, drum programming, additional programming (on "Perfect Day")
 Hugo Bjork – keyboard, guitar, bass guitar, drum programming, additional programming (on "Perfect Day")

Notes

References

External links
 "Coloring Book" on YouTube

Oh My Girl albums
2017 EPs
Korean-language EPs
Kakao M EPs